Chilateca may refer to:

San Jacinto Chilateca, Oaxaca
San Juan Chilateca, Oaxaca